Demi Busatta Cabrera (born November 4, 1990) is an American politician serving as a member of the Florida House of Representatives from the 114th district. She assumed office on November 3, 2020.

Early life and education 
Busatta Cabrera was born in Cape Coral, Florida. She earned a Bachelor of Science degree from Florida State University.

Career 
Prior to entering politics, Busatta Cabrera worked as a nonprofit development director. She later served as the chief of staff for State Senator Anitere Flores and worked in the office of the Florida Senate Sergeant-at-Arms. Busatta Cabrera was elected to the Florida House of Representatives and assumed office on November 3, 2020. During her tenure in the House, Busatta Cabrera has sponsored legislation to mitigate sea level rise in oceanfront communities.

References 

Living people
1990 births
People from Cape Coral, Florida
Florida State University alumni
Republican Party members of the Florida House of Representatives
Women state legislators in Florida
21st-century American women
Hispanic and Latino American state legislators in Florida
American politicians of Cuban descent
Latino conservatism in the United States